Coconut jam, also known as kaya jam or simply kaya, is a sweet spread made from a base of coconut milk, eggs and sugar. It is popular throughout Southeast Asia.

Indonesia, Malaysia and Singapore

The word for coconut jam in the Malay language, kaya, means rich, referencing the texture of the popular food. For Malaysians, Indonesians and Singaporeans, kaya, also called srikaya (coconut egg jam), is a sweet creamy coconut spread made from coconut milk (locally known as santan) and duck or chicken eggs (which are flavored with pandan leaf and sweetened with sugar). The resulting color varies depending on the color of the egg yolks, the amount of pandan, and the extent of the caramelization of the sugar. As a popular local spread, kaya is typically spread on toast to make kaya toast and eaten in the morning, but is also enjoyed throughout the day. Kaya can be found in most kopitiam and night markets.

Different varieties available include the nyonya kaya, which is of a lighter-green color, and Hainanese kaya, which is of a darker brown and uses caramelized sugar, and is often further sweetened with honey.

In Singapore, Malaysia and Indonesia, kaya is also used as a topping for several desserts including pulut taitai or pulut tekan, a dessert of sweet glutinous rice colored blue with butterfly pea flowers (bunga telang), and pulut seri muka, a similar dessert but colored green due to adding pandan leaves. It is also used with glutinous rice to make kuih seri kaya.

Philippines

Philippine coconut jam is known as  matamís sa báo (also matamís na báo or minatamís na báo, among other names). The names literally mean "sweetened coconut". It is different from other Southeast Asian versions in that it uses coconut cream (kakang gata, the first and second press of grated coconut meat) and cane sugar extract or molasses (treacle). It also does not use eggs and thus is more like syrup rather than custard. It is often eaten on toast or pandesal or used as a filling for pan de coco. When it is mixed with ground glutinous rice paste, it becomes a popular dessert known as kalamay. 

A less viscous version made with coconut milk (gata) is known as latik (anglicized as "coconut caramel"), and is used in place of syrup in numerous native Filipino desserts.

Thailand
The kaya of Thailand is called sangkhaya in Thai. There are two major types of kaya eaten in Thailand. One type is more liquid than the other, while the less thick kaya is similar to what is eaten in Malaysia and Indonesia. People either spread it on steamed or toasted bread or dip the bread into kaya. This kind of kaya is commonly sold by street vendors but has recently been brought into tea and coffee shops.

Another type is a concoction that has a less sticky and more custard-like texture. It is sometimes called "coconut custard" in English and is used to make sangkhaya fakthong (sangkhaya maryu in Lao), sangkhaya pumpkin or custard pumpkin, khao niao sangkhaya, glutinous rice topped with sangkhaya, and sangkhaya maphrao, sangkhaya served in a coconut.

See also 
Kalamay
Kaya toast
Latik
Roti bakar
Sankya lapov
Nata de coco
Watalappam
List of spreads

References

External links
Famous Thai Dishes including photos of Thai sangkhaya desserts
Not your usual kaya with three recipes made with palm sugar, pumpkin and taro

Jams and jellies
Bruneian cuisine
Indonesian cuisine
Malaysian cuisine
Philippine cuisine
Singaporean cuisine
Thai cuisine
Malay cuisine
Foods containing coconut
Custard desserts
Dips (food)